PSU South/Southwest 6th and College and PSU South/Southwest 5th and Jackson are a pair of light rail stations on the MAX Green, Orange and Yellow Lines in Portland, Oregon. Together, they serve as the southern passenger terminus—one for departures only and the other for arrivals only—of the Portland Transit Mall MAX line.  The stations opened on September 2, 2012.

Although MAX trains began operating regularly past the sites of these stations on August 30, 2009, construction of the stations had yet to begin, because TriMet, operator of the MAX system, was still working with Portland State University officials on finalizing plans to redevelop the block of property adjacent to (and between) the two station sites as transit-oriented development. Those development plans were finalized in 2010, and construction of a new 16-story residence hall on the block began in November 2010, for opening in 2012. For the first three years of MAX service on the Portland Mall, from 2009 to 2012, the PSU Urban Center/Southwest 6th & Montgomery Street and PSU Urban Center/Southwest 5th & Mill Street stations temporarily served as the southern terminus (for passengers) of the Green and Yellow Lines.

The stations are built into the sidewalks of 5th and 6th Avenues, with the 5th Avenue platform being for southbound trains and the 6th Avenue platform for northbound trains. Each extends along the entire block face from Jackson Street to College Street, but their names refer only to the cross street located at the head end of a train stopping there. Except on Orange Line trains, passengers heading southbound are required to disembark at this station. From here, trains then continue south to the turnaround loop located just beyond the station, where layover is taken.  There are two loop tracks immediately south of Jackson Street that allow terminating Green Line trains access to 6th Avenue from 5th, similar to the three-track loop near the Library/Southwest 9th Avenue and Galleria/Southwest 10th Avenue stations. The loop originally had three tracks, but one of them was removed when the Orange Line was built through the station.

In normal service, inbound Orange Line trains become Yellow Line trains upon arrival at this station.

References

External links
SW 5th & Jackson station (southbound) information from TriMet
SW 6th & College station (northbound) information from TriMet
MAX Light Rail Stations – more general TriMet page

2012 establishments in Oregon
MAX Light Rail double stations
MAX Green Line
MAX Yellow Line
Portland State University campus
Railway stations in the United States at university and college campuses
Railway stations in the United States opened in 2012
Railway stations in Portland, Oregon